Second War may refer to:

 World War II (1939–1945)

Other wars
 Second Sacred War (449–448 BC)
 Second Samnite War (326–304 BC), part of the Samnite Wars
 Second Punic War (218–202 BC)
 Second Macedonian War (200–196 BC)
 Second Servile War (104–103 BC)
 Second Mithridatic War (83–82 BC)
 Second Crusade (1145–1148)
 Second Barons' War (1264–1267)
 Second War of Scottish Independence (1328–1357)
 Second Italian War (1499–1504)
 Second War of Kappel (1531)
 Second Bishops' War (1640), part of the Bishops' Wars
 Second English Civil War (1648–1649)
 Second Anglo-Dutch War (1665–1667)
 Second Silesian War (1744), part of the War of the Austrian Succession
 Second Anglo-Mysore War (1780–1784)
 Second Anglo-Maratha War (1803–1805)
 Second War against Napoleon (1812–1814)
 Second Barbary War (1815)
 Second Seminole War (1835–1842)
 Second Carlist War (1846–1849)
 Second Anglo-Sikh War (1848–1849)
 Second Anglo-Burmese War (1853)
 Second Opium War (1856–1860)
 Second Italian War of Independence (1859)
 Second Schleswig War (1864)
 Second Taranaki War (1864–1866)
 Second Matabele War (1896–1897)
 Second Boer War (1899–1902)
 Second Balkan War (1913)
 Second Zhili–Fengtian War (1924)
 Second Italo-Ethiopian War (1935–1936)
 Second Sino-Japanese War (1937–1945)
 Second Cod War (1972–1973)
 Second Gulf War, one of three wars in the last two decades of the twentieth century and in the first decade of the twenty-first century 
 Second Sudanese Civil War (1983–2005)
 Second Congo War (1998-2004)
 Second Chechen War (1999–?)
 Second Liberian Civil War (1999–2003)
 Second Lebanon War (2006), the Israeli name for the 2006 Lebanon War

Fictional

 Second Bloody Valentine War
 Second Robotech War
 Warcraft II: Tides of Darkness, a computer game

See also
 Second Civil War (disambiguation)